Elections for the City of Glasgow District Council took place on 3 May 1984 alongside elections to the councils of the other districts in Scotland. The result was victory for the Labour party, who won 59 of the 66 wards.

Aggregate results

References

1984
1984 Scottish local elections
May 1984 events in the United Kingdom